The 2001 Tecate/Telmex Grand Prix of Monterrey was a Championship Auto Racing Teams (CART) motor race held on March 11, 2001 at Fundidora Park in Monterrey, Mexico in front of a crowd of 116,000 people. It was the first round of the 2001 CART FedEx Championship Series season and the inaugural open-wheel race at Monterrey (not to be confused with the Monterey Grand Prix at Laguna Seca in California). It was the first time CART had raced in Mexico since 1981. Newman/Haas Racing driver Cristiano da Matta led 32 laps of a timed race en route to his second career victory and his first with the team. Defending series champion Gil de Ferran finished 2nd and Paul Tracy finished 3rd.

Despite leading much the first half of the race and starting on pole, Team Rahal driver Kenny Bräck finished 5th after he first experienced engine difficulties and then brake problems later on. Multiple drivers and teams experienced difficulties with their cars as this was the first full race of the season.

The race distance was shortened from 80 to 78 laps to comply with the two-hour time limit. There were five lead changes and three cautions. The race was considered a huge success for an inaugural event, and it remained on the CART calendar until 2006; its success inspired a second event in Mexico City from 2002 to 2007.

Qualifying

Race

Notes
– Includes one bonus point for leading the most laps.
– Includes one bonus point for being the fastest qualifier.

Race statistics
Lead changes: 5 among 4 drivers

Standings after the race

Drivers' standings 

Constructors' standings

Manufacturer's Standings

References

 

Monterrey Grand Prix, 2001
March 2001 sports events in Mexico
2001 in Mexican motorsport